Battista Rota ((18 July 1932 – 10 July 2018) was an Italian footballer who played as a defender. He competed in the men's tournament at the 1952 Summer Olympics.

Honours

Club
Atalanta
Coppa Italia: 1962–63

References

External links
 

1932 births
2018 deaths
Italian footballers
Italy international footballers
Olympic footballers of Italy
Footballers at the 1952 Summer Olympics
Footballers from Bergamo
Association football defenders
Serie A players
Atalanta B.C. players
Bologna F.C. 1909 players
S.P.A.L. players
Atalanta B.C. managers
U.S. Cremonese managers
S.P.A.L. managers
Modena F.C. managers
Piacenza Calcio 1919 managers
L.R. Vicenza managers
Calcio Lecco 1912 managers
Italian football managers